Johann August Nahl (22 August 1710 in Berlin – 22 October 1781 in Kassel) was a German sculptor and plasterer.

He was first taught by his father Johann Samuel Nahl (1664–1727), who had been court sculptor of Frederic I since 1704. At the age of 18, Nahl undertook a journey via Sigmaringen and Bern to Strasbourg, where he worked for Robert Le Lorrain. In 1731 he went to Paris, then in 1734 to Rome, 1735 to Schaffhausen and then back to Strasbourg. Here he initially worked for the French royal steward François Klinglin and then later on the bishop's palace of Armand-Gaston de Rohan-Soubise. In 1736 he earned citizenship in Strasbourg.

Nahl is the author of the brass made in honour of Maria Magdalena Langhans,  a clergyman's wife who died giving birth, in the church Hindelbank in the Bern Canton - this brass was one of the most admired in the 18th century. Regarding this, Johann Wolfgang Goethe wrote the following to Charlotte von Stein on 20 October 1779:

"In order to hear about the tomb of the clergymen in the Hindelback you will have to have patience, for I have much to tell on, about and for it. It is a subject about which one could read many a long chapter. I wish I were able to write everything down right now. I have heard so much about it and consumed it, so to speak. People readily speak with firm enthusiasm about such things, and nobody looks at what the artist has done, or indeed wanted to do."

Personal life
His great-grandsons were the half-brothers Charles Christian Nahl and Hugo Wilhelm Arthur Nahl, painters of the American Old West.

External links 
 Thomas Weidner: Die Grabmonumente von Johann August Nahl in Hindelbank, Berner Journal für Geschichte und Heimatkunde 1995
Article written in the Bern journal for local and general history on the monuments made by Nahl in the Hindelbank.
 , an image of the tomb together with Felicia Hemans's poem on the subject.

References
Much of the content of this article comes from the German language Wikipedia article (retrieved February 25, 2006).

1710 births
1781 deaths
Artists from Berlin
18th-century German sculptors
18th-century German male artists
German male sculptors